Troy Anthony Wilson (born September 19, 1965) is a former Canadian football defensive back in the Canadian Football League who played for the Ottawa Rough Riders. He played college football for the Notre Dame Fighting Irish. He also played in the National Football League for the Cleveland Browns.

References

1965 births
Living people
American football defensive backs
Canadian football defensive backs
Ottawa Rough Riders players
Cleveland Browns players
Notre Dame Fighting Irish football players